Morpheus is a god associated with sleep and dreams. In Ovid's Metamorphoses he is the son of Sleep, who appears in dreams in human form.  Morpheus may also refer to:

Characters
 Morpheus (DC comics), a moniker for Dream, a fictional personification of dreams in the comic book series The Sandman
 Morpheus (Marvel Comics), a Marvel Comics character
 Morpheus (The Matrix), a character of The Matrix franchise
 King Morpheus, a fictional character in the Little Nemo comics
 Morpheus, a minor artificial intelligence character in the game Deus Ex
 Morpheus (Percy Jackson), a character who appears in the last book in the Percy Jackson & the Olympians series
 Morpheus D. Duvall, the principal antagonist of Resident Evil: Dead Aim

Technology
Morpheus (software), file-sharing client/server software operated by the company StreamCast Networks
 Morpheus (morphing software), morphing software for Windows and Mac OS X
 Morpheus (1987 video game), a video game developed by Andrew Braybrook in 1987
 Morpheus (1998 video game), a video game released in 1998
 Project Morpheus, a NASA project to produce a vertical test bed and pre-prototype lunar lander called Morpheus
 Project Morpheus, the codename for PlayStation VR
 Morpheus (communications system) an evolution of the British Armed Forces' Bowman communications system

Music
 Morpheus (Rebecca Clarke), a composition for viola and piano by Rebecca Helferich Clarke
 Morpheus (album), a music album by Canadian group Delerium
 A synthesizer produced in the mid-1990s by E-mu Systems

Other
 "Morpheus" (Stargate SG-1), an episode of the sci-fi TV series Stargate SG-1
 Morpheus (role-playing game), a tabletop role-playing game
 Morpheus (hotel), a hotel under construction at City of Dreams, Macau
 4197 Morpheus, an asteroid

See also
 Morfey, a Russian air defense system